Thord Dan Rickard Sundqvist (born September 10, 1958) is a Swedish music producer, songwriter and composer.

He has produced over 70 albums, and his production work has earned him seven Swedish Grammy Awards, among them Producer of The Year, which he was nominated three times for. He has so far had 15 #1 hits in Sweden and countless Top 10s, certifying at least 18 Gold and 11 Platinum awards. A handful of these albums have become classics and a part of Scandinavian pop culture.

Among these classics are Reeperbahn's Venuspassagen (1981), Jakob Hellman's ...och stora havet (1989), Wilmer X's #1 smash "Vem får nu se alla tårar" (1991), Anne-Lie Rydé's Stulna Kyssar (1992), Uno Svenningsson's "Under ytan", a super smash of (1994), Melody Club's debut and #1 hit "Electric" (2003).

Some of his latest works include the film score for the American film Whitney - a biopic on the love story of Whitney Houston and Bobby Brown on Lifetime TV, production work on Livet Är En Schlager - a musical by Jonas Gardell and Fredrik Kempe, and Peter Jöback's I Love Musicals. Composed a 31-minute running track, "The Chase", on Spotify's smartphone pioneer Running application, alongside celeb DJ Tiësto. He’s also produced and written hits with other Swedish stars like Måns Zelmerlöw, Sanna Nielsen, Helen Sjöholm, Molly Sandén, Linus Svenning, Anna Bergendahl, Andreas Weise, Fredrik Kempe, Jay Smith, and more.

He is also responsible for the score music of several Swedish classic feature films, including Vinterviken (1996), Adam & Eva (1997), and Bästa Sommaren (2000).

He runs his own business called Big Shadow Music Production Company.

Background
Dan Sundquist was born to Swedish parents in Stockholm, Sweden and grew up in Näsby Park, Rågsved, Vikarbyn, Hägersten and Vaxholm, Sweden and in Barcelona, Spain. Having musically talented people in his family most certainly groomed him into an early interest in music and arts. He started playing the guitar at age 7, and piano at age 11.

After a year in Nyckelviksskolan Art School in 1976, he decided to quit art studies and start his band Reeperbahn with Olle Ljungström, getting their first recording contract 1979. He produced his first album in 1980, 21 years old.

Swedish Grammy Awards

Sundquist has received several Swedish Grammy nominations and has won seven to date.

#1 Hits & Classics

This is a list of Sundquist's songs that have topped the Swedish Charts, and songs that have influenced Swedish pop culture.

2010 Didrik Solli-Tangen - "My Heart Is Yours". #1 ESC Norway. Gold sales.
2010 Anna Bergendahl - "This Is My Life". (Lionheart) #1 ESC Sweden, Gold sales.
2002 Melody Club - "Electric” (Virgin/EMI) #1 Hit Tracks & Gold sales.
1996 Jumper - När hela världen står utanför (Warner) #1 Hit Tracks & Platinum sales.
1996 Jumper - Tapetklister (Warner) #1 Hit Tracks & Platinum sales.
1995 Uno Svenningsson - ”Under ytan” (Record Station/BMG).
1994 Orup - "”Vid min faders grav”" (Warner) #1 HIT Gold sales and voter’s choice on Tracks radio show.
1994 Orup - "”Som Isarna När Det Blir Vår”" (Warner) #1 HIT Gold sales and voter’s choice on Tracks radio show.
1991 Wilmer X - "Vem Får Nu Se Alla Tårar" (EMI) #1 Hit, Gold Sales, 10 consecutive weeks on Svensktoppen.
1991 Anne-Lie Rydé - En sån karl (EMI) #1 Hit on Svensktoppen.
1989 Jakob Hellman - "Vara Vänner" (EMI) #1 Hit on Tracks, Gold sales, 2-time Grammy awards.
1989 Desperados - "Louise" (EMI) #1 Hit on Tracks & Sommartoppen radio shows.
1988 Fredá - "I en annan del av världen” (Record Station/Cantio) #1 Hit on Tracks, Platinum sales, Grammy Award.
1988 Wilmer X - "Teknikens Under" (EMI) #1 on Tracks, Grammy #1 Hit on Tracks, Gold sales, Grammy Award.
1986 Fredá - "Vindarna" (Cantio) #1 on Sommartoppen Radio Show  - voter’s choice.
1983 Anne-Lie Rydé - "Segla PÅ Ett Moln" (EMI)  #1 Hit on Tracks Radio Show - voter’s choice.
1981 Reeperbahn - Venuspassagen (Mercury) Cult Status/ Massive great reviews/Over 25.000 sold.

Film scores
This is a list of Sundquist's credits as a composer:
2014- Whitney - (RedOne Productions/LifeTime) Directed by Angela Bassett
2014- Att Skära Mig Fri (SVT) Directed by Setareh Persson
2013- My Stolen Revolution (Min Stulna Revolution) Directed by Nahid Persson-Sarvestani
2009- En Film Om Olle Ljungström (SVT Documentary) Directed by Jacob Frössén
2000- Den Bästa Sommaren (Memfis/Sonet) Directed by Ulf Malmros
1997- Adam & Eva (SF) Directed by Hannes Holm & Måns Herngren
1996- Vinterviken (Filmlance/Sonet) Directed by Harald Hamrell
1995- En På Miljonen (SF) Directed by Hannes Holm & Måns Herngren
1992- Hassel- Botgörarna  (SVT)  Directed by Mikael Håfström
1992- Hassel- De Giriga (SVT)  Directed by Mikael Håfström

Discography
Albums, Singles, Tracks, TV & Film Scores

This is a list of Sundquist's credits as a producer, songwriter and mixing engineer.

References 

Living people
1958 births
Swedish record producers
Swedish songwriters
Swedish composers
Swedish male composers